Bengt Kenneth Lundmark (born 25 March 1946) is a retired Swedish high jumper. He won a bronze medal at the 1968 European Indoor Games and a gold medal at the 1970 European Cup, and competed at the 1968 Summer Olympics Lundmark was the Swedish champion in 1968 and 1970 and shared a national record with Bo Jonsson in 1969.

References

1946 births
Living people
Athletes (track and field) at the 1968 Summer Olympics
Olympic athletes of Sweden
Swedish male high jumpers
People from Skellefteå Municipality
Sportspeople from Västerbotten County